Foster Farms is a poultry company based in Livingston, California.

Foster Farms may also refer to:

 Crystal Creamery, based in Modesto, California, formerly known as Foster Farms Dairy
 Foster Farms Bowl, a post-season college football bowl game sponsored by the Foster Farms poultry company

See also
 Foster Farm, a neighbourhood in Ottawa